The Cobweb Hotel is a 1936 American short film directed by Dave Fleischer and Max Fleischer and is one of the short films that belongs to the Color Classics film series. Animated by David Tendlar and William Sturm The setting is said to be one of the Fleischer's desks, which the spider used to open the hoax hotel.

Plot 
The cartoon starts off with a devious spider (voiced by Jack Mercer) who holds many fly captives in the rooms of "The Cobweb Hotel" and sees a newly married couple of flies booking a room into the fake hotel. After they discover the trap, the female fly gets ensnared in one of the spider's webs, and the male fly fights with the spider being a "flyweight champion". However, he too becomes stuck in a web during the match.

Meanwhile, his wife wriggles herself free from the web and gives freedom to all the captives, who torment the spider by flicking several sharp pen heads and firing many aspirin pills at the spider. After paying revenge to the spider, the couple hold another wedding ceremony, followed by the other captives of the hotel, until the ending scene rolls in.

References 

1936 animated films
1930s English-language films
1936 short films
1930s American animated films
1930s animated short films
1930s color films
Paramount Pictures short films
Fleischer Studios short films
Color Classics cartoons
Films set in hotels
American comedy short films
American animated short films
Short films directed by Dave Fleischer
Films about flies
Films about spiders
Animated films about insects